Brideswell is a village in Aberdeenshire, Scotland. It is named in honour of Brigid of Ireland.

Villages in Aberdeenshire